Fort Kluskus was a Hudson's Bay Company fort and trading post located near the Kluskus Lakes on the northern perimeter of the Chilcotin District of the Central Interior of British Columbia, Canada.  Established in 1844 it was effectively a relocation of trading operations from Fort Chilcotin farther south, which had failed due to disinterest and resistance by the Tsilhqot'in people.  Fort Kluskus did not succeed due to already-established strong trade relations between the local Dakelh people and coastal peoples.

See also
Kluskus First Nation

References
"North West Company" page, "Fraser's Expedition", City of Quesnel website
Chilcotin War Timeline, "We Do Not Know His Name", Great Unsolved Mysteries in Canadian history website

Pre-Confederation British Columbia
Fur trade
Chilcotin Country
Dakelh
Hudson's Bay Company forts
1844 establishments in Canada